Lindsay Rachel Glazer also known as The Alphabitch is an American stand-up comedian, and actress.

Career 
Glazer started her career as a criminal-defense attorney in South Florida and later became a stand-up comedian with the stage name "The Alphabitch."

Since then, Glazer performed stand-up or appeared as a guest on or as an actress on Justice for All with Judge Cristina Perez, (2019) Comedy Doctors (2020), & Meaningless Debate (2020).

Glazer's first album “Collateral Damage” was recorded with Comedy Dynamics at Wiseguys Comedy Club in Las Vegas.

Glazer won her round at the US Comedy Contest in 2019 and she is on Comedy Central's Sit N' Spin.

Glazer is from Peoria, Illinois. She is the daughter of Jay Glazer, former owner of Peoria Heights-based Super Liquors. She graduated from Lake Forest Academy and attended Indiana University. From there she attended Tulane University Law School.

Lawsuit

In 2019, Scottie Pippen filed suit against Glazer, her 5 year old daughter, and her ex-husband, Jacob Woloshin, related to the destruction of the mansion they rented for 7 months for $30,000/m after their primary residence was damaged by Hurricane Irma, which was later disputed by them and was later settled. The lawsuit also alleged that Pippen's knife set was missing for which Lindsay set up a GoFundMe page to replace Pippen's knife set. The page raised $31 instead of an initial objective goal of $14.

Filmography 

 Sex Life (2021)
 Comedy Doctors (2021)
 Meaningless Debate (2019)
 Justice for All with Judge Cristina Perez (2019)

References

External links 

21st-century American comedians
American stand-up comedians
American women comedians

Living people
Year of birth missing (living people)